Nirvana is a greatest hits album by the American rock band Nirvana, released on October 29, 2002. It was the third Nirvana album released following the death of vocalist and guitarist Kurt Cobain in 1994.

The album includes songs from Nirvana's three studio albums and the live album MTV Unplugged in New York, plus the previously unreleased "You Know You're Right", recorded in 1994 during Nirvana's final studio session, a version of "Been a Son", previously only available on a UK limited release, and the Scott Litt remix of "Pennyroyal Tea".

Nirvana opened at number three on the Billboard 200 with 234,000 copies sold. It has sold one million copies in the United States, and two million copies in Europe as of 2007.

Background
Nirvana was released following the settlement of a long-standing legal dispute between Cobain's widow, Courtney Love, and surviving Nirvana members Krist Novoselic and Dave Grohl.

The dispute was largely centered around "You Know You're Right," which Novoselic and Grohl had wanted to release on a long-delayed Nirvana rarities box set. However, Love blocked the song's release, and sued Novoselic and Grohl over control of Nirvana's legacy. Love's lawsuit maintained that "You Know You're Right" was a "potential 'hit' of extraordinary artistic and commercial value." She believed the song would be "wasted" on a box set, and instead belonged on a single-disc compilation similar to The Beatles' 1.

In September 2002, it was officially announced that the lawsuit had been settled, and that "You Know You're Right" would be released on "Nirvana, a one-CD history of the band," in November, with the box set to follow in 2004.

Release
The first song on the album's otherwise chronological track listing is "You Know You're Right", which was also released as a downloadable single. It is followed by "About a Girl", the only inclusion from Nirvana's 1989 debut album, Bleach. The album's producer, Jack Endino, originally saw the song as a potential single, and a live version, from Nirvana's 1993 MTV Unplugged performance, was released as a commercial single to promote the band's 1994 album MTV Unplugged in New York. "Been a Son" was previously only available on Nirvana's 1989 Blew EP, a limited UK release. The fourth song on the compilation is "Sliver", which was released as a non-album single in 1990, the band's final release on Sub Pop (the same version appears on Incesticide).

The next four songs,  "Smells Like Teen Spirit", "Come as You Are", "Lithium" and "In Bloom", are the commercially released singles from the band's second album and major label debut, Nevermind, released in 1991. These are followed by "Heart-Shaped Box", "Pennyroyal Tea" and "Rape Me", three singles from the band's third and final studio album, In Utero, released in 1993. The version of "Pennyroyal Tea" included is the remix by Scott Litt, which was prepared for the song's single, but the single was recalled after Cobain's death in April 1994. Prior to the release of Nirvana, this remix was only commercially available on the censored Wal-Mart and Kmart versions of In Utero, released in March 1994. The final studio track is the In Utero song "Dumb", which was never released as a single, but has become a popular song on alternative rock radio stations.

The Northern American version of the album closes with two songs from MTV Unplugged in New York, "All Apologies" and "The Man Who Sold the World", both of which were released as promotional singles from the album (the studio version of "All Apologies", which appears on In Utero, was released as that album's second single in 1993, as a double A-side with "Rape Me"). All non-US and Canadian versions of the album end with "Where Did You Sleep Last Night", another song from MTV Unplugged in New York, from which it was also released as a promotional single. The Japanese version includes the Unplugged version of "Something in the Way", which was released as a B-side to the "About a Girl" single in 1994, as the second-to-last track.

The album contains liner notes by music journalist David Fricke of Rolling Stone magazine.

One month after the album was released, Cobain's published Journals were released. The book debuted at No. 1 on the New York Times bestseller list (non-fiction), and it's publishers stated that the simultaneous release of the Nirvana hits set helped fire cross-promotion at retail and that the album release was providence.

Vinyl versions

The original vinyl release of Nirvana, in 2002, was a rare 16-track European double LP that included the MTV Unplugged versions "Something in the Way" and "Where Did You Sleep Last Night" as the final two tracks, similar to the Japanese CD version.

In 2015, the Northern American 14-track edition was released on vinyl for the first time, world-wide, as a double LP on 200-gram vinyl, packaged with a digital download card for 96 kHz 24-bit HD Audio, and as a single LP on 150-gram vinyl, with a download card for the album on 320 kbit MP4 audio. It was also released as a Blu-ray Pure Audio in high resolution 96 kHz 24-bit, available in three stereo audio formats: PCM, DTS-HD Master Audio and Dolby TrueHD stereo.

Critical reception

Several critics believed that Nirvana was too brief, and omitted key tracks. Stephen Thomas Erlewine of AllMusic wrote that "the presence of a few more tracks, along with placing "You Know You're Right" at the end where it belongs, would have made this collection not just stronger, but possibly definitive. As it stands, it feels like a bit of a cheap compromise and a wasted opportunity." Will Bryant of Pitchfork called the album "an artful selection of the band's most seminal material", but also dismissed it as "a party mix for parents who want to appreciate Cobain's Lennon-esque knack for great melodies without having to click past "Scentless Apprentice" or "Territorial Pissings"...utterly inoffensive: an impulse buy from Columbia House, perhaps, with no more artistic value than The Eagles' Greatest Hits or the Beatles' 1."

In 2019, the NME ranked Nirvana at number 24 on their 28 Best Greatest Hits albums list.

Track listing

Personnel
Musicians

Kurt Cobain – vocals and guitar
Krist Novoselic – bass guitar
Dave Grohl – drums (except on tracks 2, 3 and 4) and backing vocals on "In Bloom" and MTV Unplugged tracks
Chad Channing – drums on "About a Girl" and "Been a Son"
Dan Peters – drums on "Sliver"
Pat Smear – guitar on MTV Unplugged tracks
Lori Goldston – cello on MTV Unplugged tracks
Kera Schaley  – cello on "Dumb"

Production

Nirvana – production
Butch Vig – production, engineering
Steve Albini – engineering, mixing
Jack Endino – engineering, mixing
Steve Fisk – engineering, mixing
Adam Kasper – engineering, mixing
Andy Wallace – mixing
Scott Litt – production, mixing
Bob Ludwig – mastering
Robert Fisher – Art Direction
David Fricke – liner notes
Michael Meisel – project director
James Barber – project director
John Silva – project director
Corbis Bettman – photography
Frank Micelotta – photography
Frank Ockenfels – photography
Charles Peterson – photography
Redferns – photography

Charts

Weekly charts

Year-end charts

Certifications

References

Works cited
Courtney Love Sues Grohl And Novoselic, Blocks Nirvana Rarity by Teri van Horn, MTV News, June 29, 2001
A piece of Kurt Cobain by Jim DeRogatis, March 10, 2002

External links

Nirvana at YouTube (streamed copy where licensed)

2002 greatest hits albums
Albums produced by Butch Vig
Albums produced by Scott Litt
Albums produced by Steve Albini
Compilation albums published posthumously
Nirvana (band) compilation albums
Geffen Records compilation albums
DGC Records albums
Albums produced by Jack Endino